The Metropolitan Region of Campinas is an administrative division of the state of São Paulo in Brazil. It was created in 2000, and consists of the following municipalities:
 
Americana
Artur Nogueira
Campinas
Cosmópolis
Engenheiro Coelho
Holambra
Hortolândia
Indaiatuba
Itatiba
Jaguariúna
Monte Mor
Morungaba
Nova Odessa
Paulínia
Pedreira
Santa Bárbara d'Oeste
Santo Antônio de Posse
Sumaré
Valinhos
Vinhedo

References

 

Campinas